The Saint-Martin-de-Corléans Megalithic Area is an archaeological site that is considered of major importance for the study and knowledge of European prehistory and protohistory, located in the Saint-Martin-de-Corléans district of Aosta, Italy.

Description 
The site contains megalith dolmen and cist tombs, oriented alignments of holes in wooden poles and anthropomorphic stele dating back to the Neolithic era through the Bronze Age.

The site was discovered in 1969 during the construction of condominiums. Given the historical significance of the site, the Aosta Valley Regional Government purchased it to ensure protection and proper archaeological excavation. In the early 2000s the Saint-Martin-de-Corléans Archaeological Museum and Park was built over the site.

References

External links
Lovevda.it
Aosta Valley website (Italian and French)

Megalitica di Saint-Martin-de-Corleans